The 1905 Washington and Lee Generals football team represented the Washington and Lee University as an independent during the 1905 college football season. This was the school's first successful football team, capped by the victory on Thanksgiving over George Washington.

Schedule

References

Washington and Lee
Washington and Lee Generals football seasons
Washington and Lee Generals football